Gareth Williams is an American actor.

Williams attended Palm Beach State College. He played astronaut James Irwin in the HBO miniseries From the Earth to the Moon (1998), and was in such films as Malcolm X (1992), Volcano (1997), and The Cell (2000). He has a long list of television credits including Dawson's Creek, Time of Your Life, Angel, Law & Order, and Mad About You.

References

External links

Living people
Year of birth missing (living people)
Place of birth missing (living people)
American male television actors
Palm Beach State College alumni